The 2004 version of the Legion of Super-Heroes is a fictional superhero team in the 31st century of the . The team is the third incarnation of the Legion of Super-Heroes after the 1958 and 1994 versions. It first appears in Teen Titans/Legion Special (November 2004) and was created by Mark Waid and Barry Kitson.

Publication history

Following a crossover with the Teen Titans in Teen Titans (vol. 3) #16 and the Teen Titans/Legion Special, a new Legion of Super-Heroes series was launched; written by Mark Waid (who had previously rebooted the title following the events of Zero Hour) and penciled by Barry Kitson. This new series recreated the team from the beginning and used the Boy/Lad/Girl/Lass/Kid codenames which the end of the original continuity and the prior reboot continuity had moved away from using.

Initial issues of this series reintroduced the characters and provided new and divergent origins for them. Most characters resembled their previous counterparts in costume and powers, with the most notable exceptions including Chameleon Boy, now called simply Chameleon and depicted as an androgynous creature, Star Boy, who in this version of the Legion is black, Colossal Boy, who is now a giant who shrinks to human size, and Phantom Girl, who exists in two universes at once and has conversations with people in her own dimension while talking to Legionnaires at the same time.

The future universe of this Legion is an emotionally and mentally repressive society which involves human sexuality and contact being kept at arms' length as well as Orwellian surveillance of minors. The Legion's main goal is social reform as well as protecting people and inspiring them with the legends of superheroes of old, even though the team isn't appreciated by various government authorities.

The Legion is worshiped by thousands of young people on various different worlds who worship the group in a cult-like manner, collectively known as the "Legionnaires". The Legionnaires based on Earth keep a constant vigil outside Legion headquarters.

Beginning with issue #16, The Legion of Super-Heroes (vol. 5) was retitled Supergirl and the Legion of Super-Heroes with Supergirl traveling to the future and joining the Legion. With issue #31, Tony Bedard replaced Waid as writer. The title reverted to The Legion of Super-Heroes with issue #37 and Jim Shooter became writer. The series ended with issue #50, in which the script was credited to "Justin Thyme", a pseudonym previously used by uncredited comic book artists.

Final Crisis: Legion of 3 Worlds

This version of the Legion also appeared in the 2008–09 Final Crisis: Legion of 3 Worlds limited series, written by Geoff Johns and drawn by George Pérez. The mini-series features this version of the Legion teaming up with the 1994 and post-Infinite Crisis incarnations of the Legion and Superman to fight the Time Trapper and a new incarnation of the Legion of Super-Villains (led by Superboy-Prime). It is revealed at the end of the mini-series that this version of the team inhabits Earth-Prime, the home of Superboy-Prime.

Members

See also
Legion of Super-Heroes
Legion of Super-Heroes (1958 team)
Legion of Super-Heroes (1994 team)
List of Legion of Super-Heroes members
List of Legion of Super-Heroes publications

References

External links
The Legion of Super-Heroes Reference File

DC Comics superhero teams
DC Comics titles
 
Characters created by Mark Waid
Reboot comics